Royal Air Force Matching or more simply RAF Matching is a former Royal Air Force station located  east of Harlow, Essex and  northeast of London.

Opened in 1944, it was used by both the Royal Air Force and United States Army Air Forces.  During the war it was used primarily as a bomber airfield.  After the war it was closed in 1946.

Today the remains of the airfield are located on private property being used as agricultural fields.

History

USAAF use
Matching was known as USAAF Station AAF-166 for security reasons by the USAAF during the war, and by which it was referred to instead of location.  Its USAAF Station Code was "MT".

391st Bombardment Group
The first combat organisation, the 391st Bombardment Group, arrived at Matching on 26 January 1944 from Goodman AAF, Kentucky flying Martin B-26 Marauders.  Operational squadrons of the group were:
 572d Bombardment Squadron (P2)
 573d Bombardment Squadron (T6)
 574th Bombardment Squadron (4L)
 575th Bombardment Squadron (O8)

The group marking was a yellow triangle painted on the tail fin of their B-26s.

The first mission was flown on 15 February and 150 more were completed before the group moved into France in late September 1944.  The group moved onto the continent, transferring to Roye/Amy, France (ALG A-73) on 19 September 1944.  The group then switched to Douglas A-26 Invaders and flew its last mission on 3 May 1945 from Asche, Belgium (ALG Y-29).

The 391st Bomb Group returned to the United States in October and was inactivated at Camp Shanks, New York on 25 October 1945.

With the move of the 391st to France, this was the end of Matching airfield's association with the Ninth Air Force as a combat airfield.

Royal Air Force use
Douglas C-47 Skytrains of IX Troop Carrier Command were detached to Matching later in 1944 for exercises with British paratroops. In 1946 the airfield was closed and sold to private owners.

Post war

With the facility released from military control, it was rapidly returned to agricultural use and the concrete was soon removed for road hardcore but the hangar on the technical site survived for farm use. However, in the late 1980s the T-2 Hangar was dismantled and re-erected at North Weald for Aces High where it was used for TV productions, including 'The Crystal Maze' set.

Current use

The control tower still stands a half century after it was built and for some years has been used for radar experiments by Cossor Electronics. Many remaining Nissen Huts and corrugated roof buildings in the former technical site are now used for small industrial units, farming and storage along with the water tower.

Part of the main runway (03/21) that remains is now used as a public road and another surviving portion was used for heavy goods vehicle instruction.  Many single-width sections of the perimeter track are used for agricultural vehicles.  However very little of the runways, perimeter track or dispersal hardstands of the former airfield survive.  Even in aerial photography, there is very little evidence of the airfield's existence.

A memorial plaque to the men of the 391st Bomb Group is housed in Matching Church.

See also

List of former Royal Air Force stations

References

Citations

Bibliography
 Freeman, Roger A. (1994) UK Airfields of the Ninth: Then and Now 1994. After the Battle 
 Freeman, Roger A. (1996) The Ninth Air Force in Colour: UK and the Continent-World War Two. After the Battle 
 Maurer, Maurer (1983). Air Force Combat Units of World War II. Maxwell AFB, Alabama: Office of Air Force History. .
 USAAS-USAAC-USAAF-USAF Aircraft Serial Numbers--1908 to present

External links

 USAAF Station 166 - Matching, Essex

Airfields of the 9th Bombardment Division in the United Kingdom
Military units and formations established in 1943
Royal Air Force stations in Essex
Royal Air Force stations of World War II in the United Kingdom
RAF